Eugnosta aphrobapta is a species of moth of the family Tortricidae. It is found in Brazil (Esprito Santo and Rondonia), Ecuador (Napo Province).

References

Moths described in 1931
Eugnosta